Juan Diego Lojas Solano (born April 23, 1989, in Lima, Perú) is a Peruvian footballer who plays as a defender for Cienciano in the Peruvian Segunda División.

Club career
Lojas started his career in Deportivo Pesquero's youth divisions. In 2003, he transferred to Sporting Cristal's youth system. Lojas debuted with Sporting Cristal on April 23 in a match against Cienciano. He scored his first goal in a game versus Sport Boys on December 13, the same day as Sporting Cristal's anniversary.

International career
He has been called up to Peru's Under-15 national team and received a cap for the nation's Under-20's pre-selection squad.

References

External links

1989 births
Living people
Footballers from Lima
Association football defenders
Peruvian footballers
Sporting Cristal footballers
León de Huánuco footballers
Real Garcilaso footballers
Cienciano footballers
Peruvian Primera División players
Peruvian Segunda División players